Cut-out, cutout, or cut out may refer to:

 Cutout animation
 Cutout (electric power distribution), a combination fuse and knife switch used on power poles
 Cutout (espionage), a mechanism used to pass information
 Cut-out (philately), an imprinted stamp cut from an item of postal stationery
 Cut-out (recording industry), deeply discounted or remaindered recordings
 Cut out of a scene to make a film editing transition
 Naval boarding of a ship by small boats
 Sleeveless shirt
 Standee a cut-out figurine used in merchandising
 Texture bitmap with a transparent background used in 3D graphics to simulate complex geometry

See also